Candler may refer to:

People
 Candler (surname)

Places
 Candler, Florida, an unincorporated town in Marion County
 Candler, Georgia, an unincorporated community
 Candler, North Carolina, an unincorporated town in Buncombe County
 Candler County, Georgia, a county located in the U.S. state of Georgia
 Candler-McAfee, Georgia, a census-designated place in DeKalb County
 Candler Building (disambiguation), various
 Candler Field, a former name for Hartsfield-Jackson Atlanta International Airport, in honor of Mayor Asa Griggs Candler
 Candler Hospital in Savannah, a Methodist hospital which merged in 1997 to become St. Joseph's/Candler 
 Candler Park, a park in Atlanta, Georgia; also, the historic neighborhood which surrounds the park
 Candler School of Theology, one of 13 seminaries of the United Methodist Church and named for Bishop Warren Akin Candler

Other
 "Candler", a traditional Scottish tune used as the melody for the hymn "Come, O Thou Traveler Unknown"

See also
 Atlantic Southeast Airlines, based in Atlanta, Georgia, USA, whose former call sign was "Candler"
 Candling